Palwinder Singh Cheema (born 11 November 1982 in Patiala, Punjab) is a retired amateur Indian freestyle wrestler, who competed in the men's super heavyweight category. Considered one of India's top wrestlers in his decade, Cheema has claimed the gold medal at the 2002 Commonwealth Games in Manchester, England, scored two bronze in the 120-kg division at the Asian Games (2002 and 2006), and also represented his nation India at the 2004 Summer Olympics. Throughout his sporting career, Cheema trained full-time for NIS Patiala Wrestling Club under his coach and father Sukhchain Singh Cheema.

Cheema reached sporting headlines at the 2002 Commonwealth Games in Manchester, England, where he grappled his way over Canada's Eric Kirschner to fetch the gold medal in the 120-kg division on technical superiority. Following his immediate sporting success, Cheema went on to pick up a bronze at the Asian Games in Busan, South Korea, and silver at the Asian Championships in his native Delhi by the following year.

At the 2004 Summer Olympics in Athens, Cheema qualified for his first Indian squad, as a 21-year-old, in the men's 120 kg class. Earlier in the process, he placed second at the Olympic Qualification Tournament in Sofia, Bulgaria, and guaranteed a spot on the Indian wrestling team by winning his second silver from the Asian Championships in Tehran, Iran. He lost two straight matches each to eventual Olympic champion Artur Taymazov of Uzbekistan on technical superiority, and four-time Olympian Marek Garmulewicz of Poland (4–6), leaving him on the bottom of the prelim pool and placing fifteenth in the final standings.

At the 2006 Asian Games in Doha, Qatar, Cheema campaigned for his bronze medal defense over fancied Kazakh wrestler Marid Mutalimov in the 120-kg division. In 2007, Cheema bid his early retirement from wrestling at the age of 24, capping off his career with a remarkable tally of seven medals (one gold, four silver, and two bronze).Also holds RUSTAM-E-HIND title.

References

External links
 

1982 births
Living people
Olympic wrestlers of India
Wrestlers at the 2004 Summer Olympics
Wrestlers at the 2002 Asian Games
Wrestlers at the 2006 Asian Games
Wrestlers at the 2002 Commonwealth Games
Commonwealth Games gold medallists for India
Asian Games medalists in wrestling
Sportspeople from Patiala
Indian male sport wrestlers
Asian Games bronze medalists for India
Sport wrestlers from Punjab, India
Commonwealth Games medallists in wrestling
Medalists at the 2002 Asian Games
Medalists at the 2006 Asian Games
Recipients of the Arjuna Award
Asian Wrestling Championships medalists
Medallists at the 2002 Commonwealth Games